In baseball statistics, walks plus hits per inning pitched (WHIP) is a sabermetric measurement of the number of baserunners a pitcher has allowed per inning pitched. WHIP reflects a pitcher's propensity for allowing batters to reach base, therefore a lower WHIP indicates better performance. WHIP is calculated by adding the number of walks and hits allowed and dividing this sum by the number of innings pitched.

Below is the list of the top 100 Major League Baseball pitchers in Walks plus hits per inning pitched (WHIP) with at least 1,000 innings pitched.

Addie Joss is the all-time leader with a career WHIP of 0.9678. Jacob deGrom (0.9947) and Ed Walsh (0.9996) are the only other players with a career WHIP under 1.0000.

Key

List

Stats updated as of the end of the 2022 season.

Notes

References

External links

Major League Baseball statistics
WHIP